The 2011 Incheon fishing incident occurred on December 12, 2011 in Socheong Island, Incheon, South Korea. The incident involved a Chinese fisherman who was said by the South Koreans to be fishing illegally.  During the confrontation two Incheon coast guardsmen were stabbed.

Incident
At 87 km southwest of Socheng Island the 66 ton Chinese trawler Yogeumuh rammed into a South Korean coast guard ship.  The boat was seized by the South Korean coast guards for illegal fishing. The captain of the Chinese boat then stabbed two Incheon-based coast guardsmen. ROK Coast Guardsman Lee Cheong-ho died after being stabbed in the ribs.  Lee Nak-hoon was wounded after stabbed in the abdomen.

Aftermath
In Seoul, Minister of Foreign Affairs Park Suk-hwan requested the PRC ambassador to South Korea Zhang Xinsen (张鑫森) make a statement about illegal fishing and the fisherman's use of violence.  On December 8, Zhang just said the government is "increasing education" for its fishermen. Foreign Ministry spokesman Liu Weimin expressed hope that South Korea will fully protect the legitimate rights and interests of Chinese fishermen and provide humanitarian treatment.

See also
 2011 Gyeongryeolbi island fishing incident
 2010 Eocheong boat collision incident

References

2011 in China
2011 in South Korea
China–South Korea relations
Fishing conflicts